Collenette is a surname. Notable people with the surname include:

 Beatrice Collenette (1899–2001), Guernsey-born American dancer
 David Collenette (born 1946), Canadian politician
 Iris Sheila Collenette (1927–2017), British botanist
 Penny Collenette (born 1950), Canadian professor and political figure